Hiu Lai Court is located at Hiu Kwong Street in Sau Mau Ping. It is a housing estate under Home Ownership Scheme launched by Hong Kong Housing Authority. It has a total of eight blocks built in 1997. All of them belongs to Harmony blocks in their building type.

Blocks

Education
 Chan Mung Yan Lutheran Kindergarten
 C. A. S. M. P. Chen Lee Wing Tsing Kindergarten

References

Sau Mau Ping
Home Ownership Scheme
Residential buildings completed in 1997